The enzyme myo-inosose-2 dehydratase catalyzes the chemical reaction

2,4,6/3,5-pentahydroxycyclohexanone  3,5/4-trihydroxycyclohexa-1,2-dione + H2O

This enzyme belongs to the family of lyases, specifically the hydro-lyases, which cleave carbon-oxygen bonds.  The systematic name of this enzyme class is 2,4,6/3,5-pentahydroxycyclohexanone hydro-lyase (3,5/4-trihydroxycyclohexa-1,2-dione-forming). Other names in common use include inosose 2,3-dehydratase, ketoinositol dehydratase, and 2,4,6/3,5-pentahydroxycyclohexanone hydro-lyase.  This enzyme participates in inositol phosphate metabolism.  It has 2 cofactors: manganese,  and Cobalt.

References

 

EC 4.2.1
Manganese enzymes
Cobalt enzymes
Enzymes of unknown structure